Athula Wijesinghe was the Chief Minister of North Western Province between 2002 and 2013.

He is a lawyer by profession and was educated at Maliyadeva College, Kurunegala and Nalanda College Colombo.

References

Sri Lankan Buddhists
Sinhalese lawyers
Alumni of Nalanda College, Colombo
Chief Ministers of North Western Province, Sri Lanka
Provincial councillors of Sri Lanka
Living people
People from Kurunegala
Year of birth missing (living people)